Erasmus Hendrikse (born 14 December 1979) is a South African former cricketer. He played in four first-class and five List A matches for Boland in 2003 and 2004.

See also
 List of Boland representative cricketers

References

External links
 

1979 births
Living people
South African cricketers
Boland cricketers
People from Makhanda, Eastern Cape
Cricketers from the Eastern Cape